This is a list of cooking vessels. A cooking vessel is a type of cookware or bakeware designed for cooking, baking, roasting, boiling or steaming. Cooking vessels are manufactured using materials such as steel, cast iron, aluminum, clay and various other ceramics. Some cooking vessels, such as ceramic ones, absorb and retain heat after cooking has finished.

Cooking vessels

 Bain-marie or double boiler – in cooking applications, usually consists of a pan of water in which another container or containers of food to be cooked is placed within the pan of water.
 Beanpot – a deep, wide-bellied, short-necked vessel used to cook bean-based dishes. Beanpots are typically made of ceramic, though pots made of other materials, like cast iron, can also be found.
 Billycan – a lightweight cooking pot in the form of a metal bucket commonly used for boiling water, making tea or cooking over a campfire or to carry water.
 Bratt pan – large cooking receptacles designed for producing large-scale meals. They are typically used for braising, searing, shallow frying and general cooking.
 Bread pan – also called a loaf pan, a pan specifically designed for baking bread.
 Caquelon – a cooking vessel of stoneware, ceramic, enamelled cast iron, or porcelain for the preparation of fondue, also called a fondue pot.
 Casserole – a large, deep dish used both in the oven and as a serving vessel. The word is also used for the food cooked and served in such a vessel, with the cookware itself called a casserole dish or casserole pan.
 Cassole 
 Cassolette – small porcelain, glass, or metal container used for the cooking and serving of individual dishes. It can also refer to the ingredients and recipe itself.
 Cast-iron cookware – typically seasoned before use
 Cataplana – used to prepare Portuguese seafood dishes, popular on the country's Algarve region.
 Cauldron – a large metal pot for cooking or boiling over an open fire, with a large mouth and frequently with an arc-shaped hanger.

 Ding – prehistoric and ancient Chinese cauldrons, standing upon legs with a lid and two facing handles. They are one of the most important shapes used in Chinese ritual bronzes.
 Chafing dish – a cooking pan heated by an alcohol burner for cooking at table. In catering, the burner heats a water reservoir, making it a sort of portable steam table. Historically, it was a kind of portable grate raised on a tripod heated with charcoal in a brazier. The chafing dish could be used at table or provided with a cover for keeping food warm on a buffet.
 Chip pan – a deep-sided cooking pan used for deep-frying
 Crepulja – a shallow clay container with a little hole in the middle, it is put on fire until well heated, then lifted with a hook, and dough is put into it and covered with a sač. The sač is covered with ashes and live coals.
 Crock 
 Dolsot – a small-sized cookware-cum-serveware made of agalmatolite, suitable for one to two servings of bap (cooked rice). In Korean cuisine, various hot rice dishes such as bibimbap or gulbap (oyster rice) as well as plain white rice can be prepared and served in dolsot. As a dolsot does not cool off as soon as removed from the stove, rice continues to cook and arrives at the table still sizzling.

 Dutch oven – a cast iron shallow round pot with a tight-fitting lid with a raised rim around the top. The oven is placed over live coals and live coals placed in the lid as well. Used for baking, but also for cooking stews, etc. Modern versions for stewing on a stove top or in a conventional oven are thick-walled cooking pots with a tight-fitting lid with no raised rim, and sometimes made of cast aluminium or ceramic, rather than the traditional cast iron.
 Fish kettle – a large, oval-shaped kettle used for cooking whole fish. Owing to their necessarily unwieldy size, fish kettles usually have racks and handles, and notably tight-fitting lids
 French tian – an earthenware vessel of Provence, France used both for cooking and serving
 Frying pan – a flat-bottomed pan used for frying, searing, and browning foods
 Tava – a large flat, concave or convex disc-shaped frying pan (dripping pan) made from metal, usually sheet iron, cast iron, sheet steel or aluminium. It is used in South, Central, and West Asia, as well as in Caucasus, for cooking a variety of flatbreads and as a frying pan.
 Gamasot – a big, heavy pot or cauldron used for Korean cooking

 Handi – a deep, wide-mouthed cooking vessel used in north Indian, Pakistani and Bengali cooking. Because there are many specific Indian and Pakistani dishes cooked in this vessel, their names reflect its use, such as handi biryani.
 Karahi – a type of thick, circular, and deep cooking-pot similar in shape to a wok that originated in the Indian subcontinent
 Kazan – a type of large cooking pot used throughout Central Asia, Russia, and the Balkan Peninsula
 Marmite – a traditional crockery casserole vessel found in France, it is known for its "pot-belly" shape.
 Mold 
 Muffin tin
 Olla – a ceramic jar, often unglazed, used for cooking stews or soups, for the storage of water or dry foods, or for other purposes. 
 Pipkin – an earthenware cooking pot used for cooking over direct heat from coals or a wood fire.
 Palayok – a clay pot used as the traditional food preparation container in the Philippines used for cooking.

 Porringer – a shallow bowl, between 4 and 6 inches in diameter, and 1½" to 3" deep; the form originates in the medieval period in Europe and they were made in wood, ceramic, pewter and silver. A second, modern usage, for the term porringer is a double saucepan similar to a bain-marie used for cooking porridge. The porridge is cooked gently in the inner saucepan, heated by steam from boiling water in the outer saucepan.
 Potjie 
 Pressure cooker 
 Ramekin – a small glazed ceramic or glass bowl used for cooking and serving various dishes
 Rice cooker
 Roasting pan 
 Sinseollo – A Korean dish that shares the proper name for the cooking vessel in which this dish is served
 Siru – an earthenware steamer used to steam grain or grain flour dishes such as rice cakes.
 Slow cooker 
 Springform pan – a type of bakeware that features sides that can be removed from the base
 Stock pot – a generic name for one of the most common types of cooking pot used worldwide

 Sufuria – a flat based, deep sided, lipped and handleless cooking pot or container. It is ubiquitous in Kenya, Tanzania and other Great Lakes nations.
 Tajine – a North African Berber dish which is named after the earthenware pot in which it is cooked.
 Tangia – an urn-shaped terra cotta cooking vessel
 Tapayan (or tempayan) - a large earthen jar in island Southeast Asia used for cooking, fermentation, and storing water.
 Terrine –  glazed earthenware (terracotta) cooking dish with vertical sides and a tightly fitting lid, generally rectangular or oval. Modern versions are also made of enameled cast iron.
 Ttukbaegi – a type of oji-gureut, which is an onggi coated with brown-tone ash glaze. The small, black to brown earthenware vessel is a cookware-cum-serveware used for various jjigae (stew), gukbap (soup with rice), or other boiled dishes in Korean cuisine. As a ttukbaegi retains heat and does not cool off as soon as removed from the stove, stews and soups in ttukbaegi usually arrive at the table at a bubbling boil.
 Uruli
 Wok – a versatile round-bottomed cooking vessel, originating from China, it is used in a range of different Chinese cooking techniques

Coffee cooking vessels
 Cezve – a pot designed specifically to make Turkish coffee
 Dallah – a traditional Arabic coffee pot used for centuries to brew and serve Qahwa (gahwa), an Arabic coffee or Gulf coffee made through a multi-step ritual, and Khaleeji, a spicy, bitter coffee traditionally served during feasts like Eid al-Fitr.
 Jebena – a container used to brew coffee in the Ethiopian and Eritrean traditional coffee ceremony

Steamers
 Food steamers are used to cook or prepare various foods with steam heat by means of holding the food in a closed vessel reducing steam escape. This manner of cooking is called steaming.
 Couscoussier – a traditional double-chambered food steamer used in Berber and Arabic cuisines (particularly, the Libyan, the Tunisian, the Algerian and the Moroccan) to cook couscous.
 Bamboo steamer
Puttu kutti - A hemispherical or cylindrical metallic vessel used in South India to make puttu or steamed rice cake.
 Siru – an earthenware steamer used to steam grain or grain flour dishes such as tteok (rice cakes).

Brands and companies
 All-Clad – At the time of its founding, All-Clad used a patented "roll bonding" process in which metals are sandwiched together and then formed into a cooking vessel. The company derived its name from this cladding process, which is applied not only on the bottom but extends all the way up the sides of each cooking vessel. The company has been issued several patents by the United States Patent and Trademark Office (USPTO).
 Chue Chin Hua – an aluminium cookware and metal producing company in Thailand
 CorningWare – was originally a brand name for a unique glass-ceramic (Pyroceram) cookware resistant to thermal shock. It was first introduced in 1958 by Corning Glass Works in the United States.
 Cousances – French cookware manufacturer, known for enameled cast iron pans ("cocotte" in French). The company was formed in 1553 and was acquired by Le Creuset in 1957.
 Descoware – a brand of porcelain-coated cast iron cookware
 Emile Henry
 Fire-King
 Grabit – microwave-safe cookware introduced by Corning Glass Works in 1977
 Le Chasseur
 Le Creuset – a French cookware manufacturer best known for its colorfully-enameled cast-iron cookware "French ovens", also known as "casseroles" or "Dutch ovens"
 Lodge
 Nordic Ware – a company based in Minnesota notable for introducing the Bundt cake pan in the early 1950s.
Premiere Pan (USA Pan) - Manufacturers of commercial baking pans, based in suburban Pittsburgh.
Prestige - Manufacturers of cooking utensils based in India.
 Pyrex – a brand introduced by Corning Inc. in 1908 for a line of clear, low-thermal-expansion borosilicate glass used for laboratory glassware and kitchenware.
 Revere Ware – a line of consumer and commercial kitchen wares introduced in 1939 by the Revere Brass & Copper Corp., focusing primarily on consumer cookware such as skillets, sauce pans, stock pots, and tea kettles. 
 Staub – a brand of enameled cast iron cookware and bakeware that was originally headquartered in Turckheim, Alsace, France
 Swiss Diamond International – a company that produces nonstick cookware using diamond crystals
 Visions – a brand of transparent stove top cookware originally created by Corning France and released in Europe during the late 1970s and in other markets beginning a short time later. 
 West Bend Company
 Wonder Pot – an Israeli invention for baking on top of a gas stove rather than in an oven. It consists of three parts: an aluminium pot shaped like a Bundt pan except smooth-sided rather than fluted, a hooded cover perforated with venting holes, and a thick, round, slightly domed metal disc with a center hole that is placed between the pot and the flame.
 Wonderchef
 World Kitchen

Gallery

See also

 Boiling vessel
 Cooker
 Cousances 
 Fire pot
 Kitchenware
 List of cast-iron cookware manufacturers
 List of cooking appliances
 List of cooking techniques
 List of food preparation utensils
 Non-stick surface
 Sous-vide
 Thermal cooking

References

Further reading
 

 
Food- and drink-related lists
Technology-related lists
Kitchenware brands